The 2019–20 Wake Forest Demon Deacons women's basketball team represented Wake Forest University during the 2019–20 NCAA Division I women's basketball season. The Demon Deacons, led by eight year head coach Jen Hoover, are members of the Atlantic Coast Conference and played their home games at the Lawrence Joel Veterans Memorial Coliseum.

The Demon Deacons finished the season 16–16 and 7–11 in ACC play to finish in a tie for eleventh place.  As the thirteenth seed in the ACC tournament, they defeated North Carolina in the First Round and Virginia Tech in the Second Round before losing to Florida State in the Quarterfinals.  The NCAA tournament and WNIT were cancelled due to the COVID-19 outbreak.

Previous season
They finished the season 10–20, 1–15 in ACC play in last place. They lost in the first round of the ACC women's tournament to Virginia Tech.  The Demon Deacons were not invited to a post-season tournament.

Off-season

Recruiting class

Source:

Roster

Schedule

Source:

|-
!colspan=9 style=| Non-conference regular season

|-
!colspan=9 style=| ACC regular season

|-
!colspan=9 style=| ACC Women's Tournament

See also
 2019–20 Wake Forest Demon Deacons men's basketball team

References

Wake Forest Demon Deacons women's basketball seasons
Wake Forest